Adrian Mitchell FRSL (24 October 1932 – 20 December 2008) was an English poet, novelist and playwright. A former journalist, he became a noted figure on the British Left. For almost half a century he was the foremost poet of the country's Campaign for Nuclear Disarmament movement. The critic Kenneth Tynan called him "the British Mayakovsky".

Mitchell sought in his work to counteract the implications of his own assertion that, "Most people ignore most poetry because most poetry ignores most people."

In a National Poetry Day poll in 2005 his poem "Human Beings" was voted the one most people would like to see launched into space. In 2002 he was nominated, semi-seriously, Britain's "Shadow Poet Laureate". Mitchell was for some years poetry editor of the New Statesman, and was the first to publish an interview with the Beatles. His work for the Royal Shakespeare Company included Peter Brook's US and the English version of Peter Weiss's Marat/Sade.

Ever inspired by the example of his own favourite poet and precursor William Blake, about whom he wrote the acclaimed Tyger for the National Theatre, his often angry output swirled from anarchistic anti-war satire, through love poetry to, increasingly, stories and poems for children. He also wrote librettos. The Poetry Archive identified his creative yield as hugely prolific.

The Times said that Mitchell's had been a "forthright voice often laced with tenderness." His poems on such topics as nuclear war, Vietnam, prisons and racism had become "part of the folklore of the Left. His work was often read and sung at demonstrations and rallies."

Biography

Early life and career 
Adrian Mitchell was born near Hampstead Heath, north London. His mother, Kathleen Fabian, was a Fröbel-trained nursery school teacher and his father, Jock Mitchell, a research chemist from Cupar in Fife. He was educated at Monkton Combe School in Bath. He then went to Greenways School, at Ashton Gifford House in Wiltshire, run at the time by a friend of his mother. This, said Mitchell, was "a school in Heaven, where my first play, The Animals' Brains Trust, was staged when I was nine to my great satisfaction."

His schooling was completed as a boarder at Dauntsey's School, where he collaborated in plays with friend Gordon Snell.  He did his National Service in the RAF. He commented that this "confirmed (his) natural pacificism". He went on to study English at Christ Church, Oxford, where he was taught by J. R. R. Tolkien's son. He became chairman of the university's poetry society and the literary editor of Isis magazine. On graduating Mitchell got a job as a reporter on the Oxford Mail and, later, at the Evening Standard in London. He later wrote of this period:

Career 

Mitchell gave frequent public readings, particularly for left-wing causes. Satire was his speciality. Commissioned to write a poem about Prince Charles and his special relationship (as Prince of Wales) with the people of Wales, his measured response was short and to the point: "Royalty is a neurosis. Get well soon."

In "Loose Leaf Poem", from Ride the Nightmare, he wrote:

My brain socialist
My heart anarchist
My eyes pacifist
My blood revolutionary

Mitchell was in the habit of stipulating in any preface to his collections: "None of the work in this book is to be used in connection with any examination whatsoever." His best-known poem, "To Whom It May Concern", was his bitterly sarcastic reaction to the televised horrors of the Vietnam War. The poem begins:

I was run over by the truth one day.
Ever since the accident I’ve walked this way
So stick my legs in plaster
Tell me lies about Vietnam

He first read it to thousands of nuclear disarmament protesters who, having marched through central London on CND's first new format one-day Easter March, finally crammed into Trafalgar Square on the afternoon of Easter Day 1964. As Mitchell delivered his lines from the pavement in front of the National Gallery, angry demonstrators in the square below scuffled with police. Over the years he updated the poem to take into account recent events.

In 1972 he confronted then-prime minister Edward Heath about germ warfare and the war in Northern Ireland.

His poem "Victor Jara" was set to music by Arlo Guthrie and included on his 1976 album Amigo.

He was later responsible for the well-respected stage adaptation of The Lion, the Witch and the Wardrobe, a production of the Royal Shakespeare Company that premiered in November 1998.

According to writer Jan Woolf, "He never let up. Most calls—'Can you do this one, Adrian?'—were answered, 'Sure, I'll be there.' His reading of 'Tell Me Lies' at a City Hall benefit just before the 2003 invasion of Iraq was electrifying. Of course, he couldn't stop that war, but he performed as if he could."

One Remembrance Sunday he laid the Peace Pledge Union's White Poppy wreath on the Cenotaph in Whitehall. On one International Conscientious Objectors' Day he read a poem at the ceremony at the Conscientious Objectors Commemorative Stone in Tavistock Square in London.

Fellow writers could be effusive in their tributes. John Berger said that, "Against the present British state he opposes a kind of revolutionary populism, bawdiness, wit and the tenderness sometimes to be found between animals." Angela Carter once wrote that he was "a joyous, acrid and demotic tumbling lyricist Pied Piper, determinedly singing us away from catastrophe." Ted Hughes: "In the world of verse for children, nobody has produced more surprising verse or more genuinely inspired fun than Adrian Mitchell."

Mitchell died at the age of 76 in a North London hospital from a suspected heart attack. For two months he had been suffering from pneumonia. Two days earlier he had completed what turned out to be his last poem, "My Literary Career So Far". He intended it as a Christmas gift to "all the friends, family and animals he loved".

"Adrian", said fellow poet Michael Rosen, "was a socialist and a pacifist who believed, like William Blake, that everything human was holy. That's to say he celebrated a love of life with the same fervour that he attacked those who crushed life. He did this through his poetry, his plays, his song lyrics and his own performances. Through this huge body of work, he was able to raise the spirits of his audiences, in turn exciting, inspiring, saddening and enthusing them.... He has sung, chanted, whispered and shouted his poems in every kind of place imaginable, urging us to love our lives, love our minds and bodies and to fight against tyranny, oppression and exploitation."

In 2009, Frances Lincoln Children's Books published an adaptation of Ovid: Shapeshifters: tales from Ovid's Metamorphoses, written by Mitchell and illustrated by Alan Lee.

Family 

Mitchell is survived by his wife, the actress Celia Hewitt, whose bookshop, Ripping Yarns, was in Highgate, and their two daughters Sasha and Beattie. He also has two sons and a daughter from his previous marriage to Maureen Bush: Briony, Alistair and Danny, with nine grandchildren. Mitchell and his wife had adopted Boty Goodwin (1966-1995), daughter of the artist Pauline Boty, following the death of her father, literary agent Clive Goodwin, in 1978. Following Boty Goodwin's death from a heroin overdose, Mitchell wrote the poem 'Especially when it snows' in her memory.

Selected bibliography

 If You See Me Comin''', novel (Jonathan Cape, 1962)
 Poems (Jonathan Cape, 1964; 978-0224608732)
 Out Loud (Cape Goliard, 1968)
 Ride the Nightmare (Cape, 1971)
 Tyger: A Celebration Based on the Life and Works of William Blake (Cape, 1971)
 The Apeman Cometh (Cape, 1975)
 Man Friday, novel (Futura, 1975)
 For Beauty Douglas: Collected Poems 1953–79, illus. Ralph Steadman (Allison & Busby, 1981)
 On the Beach at Cambridge: New Poems (Allison and Busby, 1984)
 Nothingmas Day, illus. John Lawrence (Allison & Busby, 1984)
 Love Songs of World War Three: Collected Stage Lyrics (Allison and Busby, 1988)
 All My Own Stuff, illus. Frances Lloyd (Simon & Schuster, 1991)
 Adrian Mitchell's Greatest Hits – The Top Forty, illus. Ralph Steadman (Bloodaxe Books, 1991)
 Blue Coffee: Poems 1985–1996 (Bloodaxe, 1996; 1997 reprint)
 Heart on the Left: Poems 1953–1984 (Bloodaxe, 1997)
 Balloon Lagoon and Other Magic Islands of Poetry, illus. Tony Ross (Orchard Books, 1997)
 Nobody Rides the Unicorn, illus. Stephen Lambert (Corgi Children's, new edn 2000)
 All Shook Up: Poems 1997–2000 (Bloodaxe, 2000)
 The Shadow Knows: Poems 2001–2004 (Bloodaxe, 2004)
 Tell Me Lies: Poems 2005–2008, illus. Ralph Steadman (Bloodaxe, 2009)
 Umpteen Pockets, illus. Tony Ross (Orchard Books, 2009)
 Daft as a Doughnut (Orchard Books, 2009)
 Shapeshifters: Tales from Ovid's Metamorphoses, illus. Alan Lee (Frances Lincoln, 2009)
 Come on Everybody: Poems 1953–2008 (Bloodaxe, 2012)

 Just Adrian (United Kingdom: Oberon Books, 2012. )

 Awards 
 1961 Eric Gregory Award
 1966 PEN Translation Prize
 1971 Tokyo Festival Television Film Award
 2005 CLPE Poetry Award (shortlist) for Daft as a DoughnutReferences

 External links 

The Poetry Archive

The Argotist interview (1996)
 – 1978 recording of "Victor Jara" by the band Shenandoah (poem "Victor Jara" by Adrian Mitchell; music by Arlo Guthrie)

Obituaries and tributes
To the memory of Adrian Mitchell  World Socialist web site
Michael Horovitz, "Adrian Mitchell: Poet and playwright whose work was driven by his pacifist politics", The Independent, 23 December 2008. 
Michael Kustow, "Poet Adrian Mitchell dies, aged 76", The Guardian, 21 December 2008. 
"Adrian Mitchell", Daily Telegraph, 13 January 2009.
"Adrian Mitchell: protest poet and prose writer", The Times, 23 December 2008.
William Grimes, "Adrian Mitchell, British Poetry’s Voice of the Left, Dies at 76", The New York Times, 23 December 2008.
Dan Carrier, "‘Adrian was a genius. He was a tender, political poet who never compromised’", Camden New Journal, 23 December 2008.
Michael Rosen, "Passionate poet unafraid of the big stuff", The Times, 23 December 2008.
"Shadow on the sun", Red Pepper'', March 2009.

1932 births
2008 deaths
Alumni of Christ Church, Oxford
English activists
English librettists
English male journalists
English pacifists
English socialists
Fellows of the Royal Society of Literature
People educated at Monkton Combe School
People educated at Greenways School
English male poets
English male dramatists and playwrights
20th-century English poets
20th-century English dramatists and playwrights
Transatlantic Records artists
20th-century English male writers